Motaalleq Mahalleh or Motaaleq Mahalleh may refer to:
 Motaalleq Mahalleh-ye Arbastan
 Motaalleq Mahalleh-ye Nowbijar